Kiowa is a home rule municipality town and the county seat of Elbert County, Colorado, United States. The town population was 723 at the 2010 United States Census, up from 581 at the 2000 census.

History
The town was named for the Kiowa people. Settled in 1859, it was originally named "Wendling" after an early settler. It was called "Middle Kiowa" from the 1860s until 1912, when it was incorporated and the word "Middle" was dropped. It became the county seat of Elbert County in 1874. Kiowa suffered from major flooding in 1935.

Geography
Kiowa is located in western Elbert County at  (39.344207, −104.462714), on the east side of Kiowa Creek, a north-flowing tributary of the South Platte River. Colorado State Highway 86 passes through the town, leading east  to Limon and west  to Castle Rock.

Demographics

As of the census of 2000, there were 581 people, 227 households, and 152 families residing in the town. However, outside of this incorporated town's limits there are several thousand other new residents of this fast-growing county. The racial makeup of the town was 94.49% White, 0.34% African American, 0.86% Native American, 0.17% Asian, 1.20% from other races, and 2.93% from two or more races. Hispanic or Latino of any race were 4.30% of the population.

There were 227 households, out of which 41.4% had children under the age of 18 living with them, 52.4% were married couples living together, 11.0% had a female householder with no husband present, and 33.0% were non-families. 24.2% of all households were made up of individuals, and 9.3% had someone living alone who was 65 years of age or older.  The average household size was 2.52 and the average family size was 3.10.

In the town, the population was spread out, with 30.5% under the age of 18, 9.0% from 18 to 24, 36.3% from 25 to 44, 17.0% from 45 to 64, and 7.2% who were 65 years of age or older.  The median age was 32 years. For every 100 females, there were 106.0 males.  For every 100 females age 18 and over, there were 100.0 males.

The median income for a household in the town was $40,809, and the median income for a family was $42,353. Males had a median income of $34,875 versus $26,071 for females. The per capita income for the town was $17,885.  About 7.0% of families and 6.8% of the population were below the poverty line, including 6.3% of those under age 18 and none of those age 65 or over.

Religion
Kiowa Creek Community Church
Majestic View Church
Nazarene Church
Graceway Bible Church
Our Lady of the Visitation Parish
Save the Cowboy

See also

Outline of Colorado
Index of Colorado-related articles
State of Colorado
Colorado cities and towns
Colorado municipalities
Colorado counties
Elbert County, Colorado
List of statistical areas in Colorado
Front Range Urban Corridor
North Central Colorado Urban Area
Denver-Aurora-Boulder, CO Combined Statistical Area
Denver-Aurora-Broomfield, CO Metropolitan Statistical Area

References

External links
Town of Kiowa website
CDOT map of the Town of Kiowa

Towns in Elbert County, Colorado
Towns in Colorado
Colorado placenames of Native American origin
County seats in Colorado
Denver metropolitan area